Melanotus cribriventris, is a species of click beetle found in India, Sri Lanka, China and USA.

Description
Body length is about 10 mm. Length of elytra is 7.5 mm.

References 

Elateridae
Insects of Sri Lanka
Insects described in 1910